The figure of the Korean woman has undergone changes with the succession of times, following the changes in the family structure.

Family structure from the Goryeo Dynasty to the Joseon Dynasty 
The transformation of the family from the Goryeo Dynasty (918 - 1392) to the Joseon Dynasty (1392 - 1910) caused the gradual decline of Korean women’s status and visibility in the public sphere. The most impressive change was a shift from an emphasis on a matrilineal to a patrilineal structure of kinship and identity.

During Goryeo Dynasty newly married couples used to live with the bride's family, which offered numerous advantages for the women, not least of which was economic. A woman could safeguard her share of the inheritance she shared equally with her male siblings. 
In the Joseon Dynasty the establishment of a patrilineal line eroded women's rights and privileges from the changing of residential arrangements to the rigid rule of primogeniture, which identified the eldest son as the principal heir, as considered important for the sustainability and continuity of the lineage.

The moral of Confucianism imposed a strict division of the sexes, presumably to prevent adultery and other sexual misconducts. Over time, these meticulous laws about family relations sought to maintain parental authority, the prerogatives of social class, the discouragement of illegitimacy and the domination of men in matters of inheritance.

The institution of "Seven Evils Rules" (which included the inability to bear a son, disobedience to her parents-in-law, adultery, display of jealousy, chronic illness, theft and loquacity) gave men the opportunity to use these clauses to divorce their wives.

So korean women during Joseon Dynasty were completely powerless in this rigid structure.

Korean women and social change: new family structures 
In South Korea marriage and the typical family structure are understood as a heterosexual institution. This supports the representation of the population through the division of gender work.  This system is based on the traditional dichotomy of gender roles with the role of head of the family played by the male and the role of housewife played by the female. The traditional division of labor allows families to accumulate capital more efficiently, thanks to the unpaid domestic work and childcare done by the women in the family.

The problematic inherent in family structure, in particular in South Korea’s heterosexually marriage-centered housing and loan-lending structure reveals the struggles of korean women to acquire ‘a room of one’s own’, as 'esook Song points out and as it is the consequence of the process of their spatial independence, to break away from traditional family patterns.

In particular 
"single women living apart from their parents are considered unusual in South Korea, where Confucian patriarchal thought views women as belonging to their fathers until they are married".

According to the Population and Housing Census 2019, published by KOSTAT (Statistics Korea), the number of single households reaches 30.2% of all households in Korea, and 1-person and 2-person households occupied 58.1% of the total households, up 1.5% from 56.5% in 2018.  In addition, there is a tendency for young South Koreans to not want to start a family in the age group of 20, on the contrary, many seek to focus on their academic and working life. Unlike the past, being single is becoming less of a stigma. Despite the trend is relatively still new, being single in Korea is rather celebrated as being independent and self-appreciating.

Role of women in the family 
Marriage and pregnancy  are not individual decisions for many Korean women. The benefits of these social reproductions were enjoyed at the expense of women's power in societies. However, Korean women's role as mothers should not be understood with such easiness. Korean women consider themselves to be moderately important, and it is often their role as mothers that strengthens their position in society, which mobilizes their resources and positions.

Manager Mothers 
The figure of the Manager Mother is an emerging image in the educational context of South Korea.
Specifically, neoliberal transformations have promoted the evolution of the maternal figure within the family, strengthening and evolving its role as educational support.

Mothers have different nicknames in the Korean society. One of the most popular of these names, is 'Manager Moms'.

These mothers manage school work,  GPAs and their children’s strategies to enter prestigious universities. Their abilities are determined by how much information they have access to and their usefulness in order to finally get their children into a prestigious university.

This process starts at the age of their children’s day care. Once their children enters and graduates from elite universities, these young adults’ chances to get a white-collar job increase. In a sense, the actions of the mothers managers are oriented to the future success of their children. Here the children's success become an opportunity and tool for the whole family. Their success will secure, if not promote, the whole family's chance to continue to belong to or become middle- and upper-class members of Korean society. In turn, the family's upward mobility is in the hands of these moms. 
In modern Korean society, individuals must continuously develop as a creative and self-managed citizen. Manager moms are fostering these citizens through their own unpaid, domestic care management skills. It is believed that their work comes from natural maternal love. They are expected to be good at managing because they are natural caregivers and because they are responsible for their children's success. Their performance is judged by their children's performances but their work and success are not rewarded beyond simple praise.

This maternal subjectivity is very outraged and pitied. Some see these mothers as people who are obsessed and who go beyond social limits to make their children succeed. Others regret that these women are in fact preys of the rigid competitive Korean education system. In addition, the expected ability of mothers managers often promises their full-time status as middle-class housewives with sufficient economic, cultural and social resources. This makes working mothers or working-class mothers feel relatively deprived and irresponsible for their children. The advent of managing mothers can be defined as creating the modern Korean family.

See also 
 Confucianism

Bibliography 
 David P. Baker and David L. Stevenson - Mothers' Strategies for Children's School Achievement: Managing the Transition to High School, in Sociology of Education Vol. 59, No. 3, Jul. 1986.
  Katrina Maynes, Korean Perceptions of Chastity ceptions of Chastity, Gender Roles, and Libido; F , Gender Roles, and Libido; From Kisaengs to the Twenty First Century, in Grand Valley Journal of History, vol. 1, n. 1, February 2012.
 Michael J. Pettid & Youngmin Kim - Women and Confucianism in Chosŏn Korea: New Perspectives, in Journal of Korean Religions Vol. 3, No. 1, Late Chosŏn Buddhism, April 2012.
 Park So Jin - Educational Manager Mothers: South Korea’s Neoliberal Transformation, in Korea Journal  Vol. 47, no.3, 2007.
 Jesook Song - ‘A room of one’s own’: the meaning of spatial autonomy for unmarried women in neoliberal South Korea, in Gender, Place and Culture Vol. 17, No. 2, April 2010.

Notes

External links 
 kostat.go.kr
 www.korea.net

Korea